Stoneyburn is a village in West Lothian, Scotland. Nearby towns include Bathgate, Whitburn, Addiewell and Blackburn.

Geography 
Stoneyburn is situated in the Central Belt of Scotland, some 4 miles from Bathgate in the north and 5 from Livingston in the east. At approximately 25 miles from the centre of Scotland's two major cities, Glasgow and Edinburgh, the village is situated 2 miles away from junction 4 of the M8, Scotland's main motorway.
Despite this, it is situated in a semi-rural area, surrounded by dairy farms and fields.
Around three thousand people inhabit the village, which is around 1.5 miles in length, clustered around the B7015 to Fauldhouse and Livingston.
Traditionally, the village is divided between Stoneyburn proper and Bents, the latter in the days of railway travel being the location of the railway station.

Community 
Stoneyburn is home to a bowling club, football team Stoneyburn F.C., two primary schools (Stoneyburn Primary School and Our Lady's). There is a Roman Catholic church (Our Lady's) and a Church of Scotland as well as a Pentecostal Church in the village.  The village also has local shops including a Cafe, florists, (closed 2021) post office, chemist and convenience shops. There is also a Community Centre and a Health Centre within the village.

The Scots language is very evident in its use in Staneyburn.

The public house in the village is the Ewington Hotel. The Bentswood Inn closed in January 2017.

References

External links

Canmore - Stoneyburn, Stoneyburn House site record
Canmore - Stoneyburn, Main Street, Stoneyburn Parish Church site record

Villages in West Lothian